Deh Huleh-ye Olya (also Romanized as Deh Hūleh-ye ‘Olyā; also known as Ḩūleh and Ḩūleh-ye ‘Olyā) is a village in Khaneh Shur Rural District, in the Central District of Salas-e Babajani County, Kermanshah Province, Iran. At the 2006 census, its population was 188, in 48 families.

References 

Populated places in Salas-e Babajani County